Vipera walser, the Walser viper or Piedmont viper is a viper endemic to the western Italian Alps. While long considered as an isolated population of Vipera berus, molecular analyses have shown it to be a distinct species related to the Vipera ursinii-complex.

Morphology 
Morphologically, Vipera walser closely resembles the far more widespread Vipera berus. It differs in having a higher number of cephalic scales and more frequently shows fragmentation of the cephalic large shields. Additionally, most individuals possess 1.5 to 2 rows of subocular scales at both sides of the head, while Vipera berus usually only has a single row. Colouration is highly variable, with some specimens possessing a typical dorsal zigzag pattern, and others with a reduced pattern of horizontal bars. Additionally, melanistic individuals exist.

Geographic range 
Vipera walser is limited to a small area north of the Italian town of Biella. The range is divided in a northern population of ±45 km² and a southern population of ±225 km².

Ecology 
Vipera walser occurs in open habitats at an altitude of 1300-2300 m in valleys with high precipitation. It is mostly found on gentle south-oriented slopes with low forest cover.

Threats and conservation 
Due to its recent description, Vipera walser has not yet been evaluated by IUCN, although the original species description argues that the limited extent of occurrence (<1000 km²) warrants a classification as 'endangered'. Fragmented habitat, decline in agropastoral landuse, culling and collection pose short-term threats, while in the long term climate change may alter the distribution. Additionally, low genetic variability may make the species even more prone to disturbances.

References 

Reptiles described in 2016
walser
Reptiles of Europe